The 1894 Syracuse Orangemen football team represented Syracuse University during the 1894 college football season. The head coach was George H. Bond, coaching his first season with the Orangemen.

Schedule

References

Syracuse
Syracuse Orange football seasons
Syracuse Orangemen football